The 19th ESPY Awards were held on July 13, 2011, at the Nokia Theatre, hosted by Seth Meyers. ESPY Award is short for Excellence in Sports Performance Yearly Award.

Categories 
There are 33 categories. The winners are listed first in bold. Other nominees are in alphabetical order.

In Memoriam

Seve Ballesteros
Lorenzen Wright
Andy Irons
Lorenzo Charles
John Henry Johnson
Andy Robustelli
Robert Traylor
Dave Duerson
Ron Santo
Maurice Lucas
Grete Waitz
Bud Greenspan
Jack Tatum
Derek Boogard
Jack LaLanne
Nick Charles
Bobby Thomson
Pat Burns
Dick Williams
George Blanda
Don Meredith
John Mackey
Bob Feller
Duke Snider
Harmon Killebrew
Sparky Anderson

See also
 Best Male College Athlete ESPY Award
 Best Female College Athlete ESPY Award

2011
ESPY
ESPY
ESPY
ESPY